Hidden Stash is the first b-sides and rarities collection and second official album of the Kottonmouth Kings, released on October 26, 1999. Shortly after the release of previous album, Royal Highness, Saint Dog left the group to pursue a career with his brother Big Hoss, who, according to the song "Big Hoss," was in  prison at the time Royal Highness was made. To replace him, they called in their old friend (and original Kottonmouth King) Johnny Richter, who was part of the group until 2013.

On September 15, 2009, Hidden Stash was re-issued with the "OG Dopeumentary" DVD as Double Dose V1, the first in a series of three double dose sets.

Track listing 

(*) indicates original Kottonmouth Kings' demo

Personnel
Daddy X - Vocals, Lyrics
D-Loc - Vocals, Lyrics
Johnny Richter - Vocals, Lyrics
Lou Dogg - Drums, Percussion
DJ Bobby B - DJ, Turntables, Engineer, Programmer
Saint Dog - Vocals, Lyrics

References 

Kottonmouth Kings albums
1999 albums
Suburban Noize Records albums